Juan Manuel Garcia III (born May 27, 1966) was the 17th United States Assistant Secretary of the Navy (Manpower and Reserve Affairs) and a Democratic member of the Texas House of Representatives, representing the 32nd District from 2007 until 2009. He is currently the Global Leader for Career Advancement for Amazon.com.

Early years, 1966–1992 
Juan M. Garcia III was born on May 27, 1966 in St Louis, Missouri. He graduated from the University of California, Los Angeles in 1988 and then attended the joint J.D. / M.A. program at Harvard Law School and the John F. Kennedy School of Government, graduating in 1992.

Military service, 1992-2004 
Upon graduation, Garcia reported for Aviation Officer Candidate School and was subsequently trained as a United States Naval Aviator at Naval Air Station Corpus Christi in Texas. His first posting was in Patrol Squadron 47, based out of Naval Air Station Barbers Point in Hawaii. He later served missions in the Persian Gulf and the Western Pacific Ocean. During the 1999 NATO bombing of Yugoslavia, he initially served in London as flag aide-de-camp to the Deputy Commander of United States Naval Forces Europe, and then deployed as part of Operation Allied Force. He also served in supporting the enforcement of the no-fly zone in Iraq aboard the USS Constellation (CV-64). His military awards include the Joint Service Commendation Medal, the Navy Commendation Medal, and the Navy Achievement Medal.

Garcia spent 1999 and 2000 as one of sixteen White House Fellows, during which time he served as a Special Assistant to United States Secretary of Education Richard Riley.

Following his year at the White House, Garcia returned to the United States Navy, serving as Officer of the Deck on board the USS Constellation (CV-64). The next year, he returned to the Naval Air Station Corpus Christi as a flight instructor with Training Squadron 27.

Post-military, 2004–2006 
Garcia left active service in 2004, although he retained a position in the United States Navy Reserve as the commanding officer of Reserve Training Squadron 28 at Corpus Christi, Texas. At this time, he joined the Corpus Christi law firm of Hartline, Dacus, Barger, Dreyer, and Kern as an associate attorney.

Member of the Texas House of Representatives, 2007–2009 
In 2006, he ran on the Democratic ticket for the Texas House of Representatives for the 32nd District. Garcia defeated 5-term incumbent Eugene Seaman with just 48% of the total vote. A third candidate, Lenard Nelson, won 6% as a Libertarian. During the campaign, Seaman had mailed out many circulars criticizing Garcia, as did Garcia of Seaman. A scandal involving Seaman and the homestead exemption, though, also became an issue. On the morning after the election, Seaman had led by a narrow 24 votes, as there were three precincts in San Patricio still pending counts. By 9 p.m., though, the votes, hand-counted, gave Garcia the seat.

Garcia was defeated for re-election in 2008 by Republican Todd Ames Hunter, a lawyer from Corpus Christi who previously served in the House from Districts 36 (1989-1993) and District 32 (1993-1997), each of those eight years as a Democrat. The final tally was 50.13% for Hunter, 46.79% for Garcia, and 3.06% for returning Libertarian candidate Leonard Nelson. Garcia conceded on election night.

Assistant Secretary of the Navy (Manpower and Reserve Affairs), 2009–2015 
In 2009, Garcia was nominated as Assistant Secretary of the Navy (Manpower and Reserve Affairs) by President of the United States Barack Obama. Garcia was confirmed by the Senate Armed Services Committee on August 5, 2009. His nomination proceeded to the full Senate, where he was confirmed on September 16, 2009.

Amazon 
In 2015, Garcia joined Amazon as its Global Leader for Career Advancement.

References 

 Biography of Garcia on the website of the Secretary of the Navy
 News story on announcement of Garcia's appointment as Assistant Secretary of the Navy (Manpower and Reserve Affairs)

External links 

Navy Biography
Texas House of Representatives - Juan Garcia - official TX House website
Juan Garcia for State Representative - official campaign website
Swearing in photos by Richard A. Salazar on Facebook
official page for House State Texas Race on YouTube

1966 births
Living people
United States Department of Defense officials
United States Assistant Secretaries of the Navy
Hispanic and Latino American state legislators in Texas
Obama administration personnel
Democratic Party members of the Texas House of Representatives
White House Fellows
Harvard Kennedy School alumni
Harvard Law School alumni
21st-century American politicians